The İstanbul Painting and Sculpture Museum (İstanbul Resim ve Heykel Müzesi) is in the Tophane area of European İstanbul, Turkey, and is part of the large Galataport complex.

The museum was originally housed in the mansion of the crown prince attached to the Dolmabahçe Palace in the Beşiktaş neighbourhood of İstanbul. The building housing it dated back to 1856. On 20 September 1937, Mustafa Kemal Atatürk, the founder of the Turkish Republic, suggested its conversion into a museum since the imperial family had been driven into exile with the coming of the Turkish Republic.

It has now been moved into a new gallery on the edge of the Galataport where it is very close to the Istanbul Modern gallery, turning the area into an artistic hub for the city. The building chosen - Antrepo No 5 - was originally designed to serve the old port at Karaköy by the Turkish architect Sedad Hakkı Eldem. It has been repurposed to serve as an art gallery by the Emre Arolat firm of architects.

The museum started to open in December 2021 and is expected to fully open in September 2022.

Museum Contents 
The new museum exhibits Turkish painting and sculpture from late Ottoman times through to modern times. A whole gallery is devoted to the work of Osman Hamdi Bey, the founder of Istanbul's first school of art and himself a painter. 

Another gallery exhibits examples of modern calligraphy alongside examples of Turkish abstract art, developed from the 1940s onwards, by such artists as Şemsettin Arel and Abidin Elderoğlu. who were influenced by traditional calligraphy.

Another gallery shows paintings developed by Turkish artists send on 'Homeland Journeys' (Yurt Geziler in Turkish) into Anatolia in the early years of the Turkish Republic so that they could reflect the culture of the whole country and not just that of Istanbul, the artistic capital, in their work .

Another gallery displays copies of paintings hanging in overseas museums made by Turkish artists in the early days of the Republic when Osman Hamdi Bey and his brother, Halil Ethem, thought this would help develop a new figurative art tradition for the country.

Notable Paintings at the museum

References

Museums in Istanbul
Museums established in 1937
Art museums and galleries in Turkey
Beşiktaş
Dolmabahçe Palace